Gennady Vladimirovich Kuzmin is a Russian diplomat, serving as of 2022 as Deputy Permanent Representative of the Mission of Russia to the United Nations. He is best known for a resolution adopted by the eleventh emergency special session of the United Nations General Assembly on 7 April 2022, in which he took part to defend Russia from getting suspended from the United Nations Human Rights Council. He has also stated that the resolution was "politically motivated".

References

Living people
Diplomats
Russian diplomats
Year of birth missing (living people)